Cuyahoga County Public Library (CCPL) has 27 branches that serve 47 communities in Cuyahoga County, Ohio. It was ranked the number one public library in the United States among libraries serving populations of more than 500,000 by the Hennen's American Public Library Ratings 2010. In 2009, more than 19 million items were borrowed by its 528,449 cardholders, and 7.6 million visits were made to branches.

In May 2006, the Library launched a new website, which Ektron gave its MVP award as the 2006 Best Overall Site in August. The site allows visitors to register online for a new library card, view their accounts and renew items, and apply for library jobs. They can also order tickets for an author series and make contributions to the library's foundation. In May 2006, Cuyahoga County Public Library became the first public library in the nation to provide cardholders with the option of having their library notices delivered via text messaging.

As a member of OhioLINK, a consortium of 85 colleges and universities and the State Library of Ohio, Cuyahoga County Public Library cardholders have direct access to more than 11 million additional items. Also, the SearchOhio consortium among the libraries of Westerville and the county libraries of Cuyahoga, Mahoning, Lucas, Trumbull, Stark, Summit, Portage, and Greene allows for direct access to almost 10 million additional items.

Cuyahoga County Public Library has branches in the suburbs of Bay Village, Beachwood, Bedford, Berea, Brecksville, Brook Park, Brooklyn, Chagrin Falls, Fairview Park, Garfield Heights, Gates Mills, Independence, Maple Heights, Mayfield, Middleburg Heights, North Olmsted, North Royalton, Olmsted Falls, Orange, Parma (Parma-Powers and Parma-Snow branches), Parma Heights, Richmond Heights, Solon, South Euclid-Lyndhurst, Strongsville, and Warrensville Heights

Services

Eight of the library's branches contain homework centers for use by students in grades K-10. Each center is staffed by a coordinator and tutors enrolled in the America Reads program at Cleveland State University and Baldwin-Wallace College. In the 2008–2009 school year, over 12,500 homework sessions were logged. The tenth center opened January 20, 2009 at the North Olmsted branch. The centers are funded through a grant from the Cleveland Foundation.

The library also offers passport services at all of its branches.  The passport centers are open every day of the week until one hour before the branch closes.

Over 700 age appropriate toys and story kits are available through the Youth Literacy and Outreach Department.

The Fairview Park branch houses the genealogy collection.  Anyone can access the online resources with a valid library card.  These resources include Ancestry, Fold3, and Heritage Quest.

Renovations

In 2011, the Cuyahoga County Public Library undertook an extensive construction and renovation program. Several branches have either been renovated or replaced by newer facilities. In 2012, the Beachwood and Solon Branches were renovated. Warrensville Heights opened a new state of the art library. The Mayfield Heights branch was moved to a new location on SOM Center Road in Mayfield.  Garfield Heights, which had one of smallest branches at 11,165 sqft and built in 1964–65, broke ground on May 7, 2012, for a newer 30,000 sqft glass and steel structure which opened on September 7, 2013. Parma will have two branches. One Parma Library will be a consolidation of two branches and the new library was built near Parma City Hall. Parma-Snow was expanded and connected to the Library's administration center.  The North Royalton library, originally located in the city's Memorial Park, was moved to a new facility in 2013. Also in   
2012, the Library board announced plans to move the South Euclid-Lyndhurst branch from the historic Telling Mansion, its site since 1952, to a new site on Green Road across from Notre Dame college - which opened in 2015.

Collaboration

In 2003, Cuyahoga County Public Library and the Cleveland Public Library collaborated to create the Greater Access Library Card. The card allows customers of either library and the libraries in the CLEVNET network to take out books from both systems without having to carry more than one library card.

See also
Cleveland Public Library

References

External links
Cuyahoga County Public Library
Cuyahoga County Public Library history

Libraries in Cuyahoga County, Ohio
Public libraries in Ohio